Harzand Station ( – Īstgāh-e Harzand; also known as Istgāh-e Alakī and Īstgāh-e Halākū) is a village and railway station in Harzandat-e Sharqi Rural District, in the Central District of Marand County, East Azerbaijan Province, Iran. At the 2006 census, its population was 24, in 6 families.

References 

Populated places in Marand County
Railway stations in Iran